Tubac is a census-designated place (CDP) in Santa Cruz County, Arizona, United States. The population was 1,191 at the 2010 census. The place name "Tubac" is an English borrowing from a Hispanicized form of the O'odham name Cuwak, which translates into English as "place of dark water". When first taken into Spanish speech, it was spelled Tubaca. Finally, over time, the latter "a" was dropped. Tubac is situated on the Santa Cruz River.

Tubac was the original Spanish colonial garrison in Arizona. It was depopulated during the O'odham Uprising in the 18th century. During the 19th century, the area was repopulated by miners, farmers and ranchers, but the town of Tubac is best known today as an artists' colony.

Geography
Tubac is located at  (31.625462, -111.051921).

History 
Established in 1752 as a Spanish presidio, the first Spanish colonial garrison in what is now Arizona, Tubac was one of the stops on the Camino Real (the "Royal Road") from Mexico to the Spanish settlements in California.

Tubac's most famous Spanish resident was Juan Bautista de Anza. While stationed at Tubac (1760–1776), de Anza built the chapel of Santa Gertrudis, the foundations of which lie beneath today's St. Ann's Church.

Apaches attacked the town repeatedly in the 1840s, forcing the Sonoran Mexicans to abandon both Tumacacori and Tubac.

Tubac was the scene of a four-day siege in 1861, between Tubac's male population, Confederate militia and Apache warriors.

The Confederates won and the Confederate flag used by the headquarters in Richmond was raised. When Union troops then started to approach Tucson the Confederate troops left Tubac. There the town laid abandoned; grass grew in the streets and the adobe houses crumbled away.

In the 1930s–1960s Tubac became an art colony. Painter Dale Nichols opened an art school in the small desert village in 1948 and restored some of Tubac's historic buildings. Students included watercolorist Al Romo and sculptor Bob Brisley. In 1961, the Santa Cruz Valley Art Association was formed with 80 members and the group founded the Tubac Festival of the Arts in 1964. Other significant artists in the Village included Sophie and Harwood Steiger, Hal Empie and Hugh Cabot.

Attractions
The remains of the old Spanish presidio are preserved by Tubac Presidio State Historic Park. The park also features a regional museum, an underground archeology display, and other historic buildings. Modern Tubac is home to over 100 art galleries, home decor boutiques, gift shops, jewelers, potters, and artists of every kind. There is a very active art school, many restaurants, and a golf resort nestled along a verdant valley with one of the oldest stands of cottonwoods in the state.

Demographics

2010 census
As of the census of 2010, there were 1,191 people residing in Tubac. The racial makeup of Tubac was 76.7% non-Hispanic White, 0.6% Native American, 0.4% Black or African American, 0.59% Asian, 6.5% from other races, and 1.1% from two or more races.  20.7% of the population were Hispanic or Latino of any race.

In Tubac 1.5% of the population was age 0–4, 4.7% from 5 to 17, 51.0% from 18 to 64, and 42.5% 65 years of age or older. The population of Tubac is 52.4% female and 47.6% male.

2000 census
As of the census of 2000, there were 949 people, 481 households, and 303 families residing in the CDP. The racial makeup of the CDP was 88.7% White, 1.2% Native American, 0.4% Asian, 9.0% from other races, and 0.7% from two or more races.  18.2% of the population were Hispanic or Latino of any race.

There were 481 households, out of which 12.5% had children under the age of 18 living with them, 59.3% were married couples living together, 2.9% had a female householder with no husband present, and 36.8% were non-families. 32.6% of all households were made up of individuals, and 21.0% had someone living alone who was 65 years of age or older.  The average household size was 1.97 and the average family size was 2.45.

In the CDP, the population was spread out, with 12.3% under the age of 18, 2.5% from 18 to 24, 12.1% from 25 to 44, 37.8% from 45 to 64, and 35.2% who were 65 years of age or older.  The median age was 58 years. For every 100 females, there were 92.5 males.  For every 100 females age 18 and over, there were 89.5 males.

The median income for a household in the CDP was $39,444, and the median income for a family was $59,375. Males had a median income of $36,528 versus $30,268 for females. The per capita income for the CDP was $46,643.  About 2.1% of families and 6.6% of the population were below the poverty line, including none of those under age 18 and 7.9% of those age 65 or over.

Historic ruins and structures in Tubac
This is a list with images of historic ruins and structures in Tubac which includes the Presidio Captains Quarters, St. Ann's Catholic Church, the Tubac schoolhouse and various historic residences. Also, included are displays of historical significance on display in the Tubac Presidio State Historic Park Museum and in the museum's underground.

The historic Tubac schoolhouse and inside furnishings

Notable people
Congressman Will Rogers, Jr. retired to a ranch near Tubac and is buried at the Tubac Cemetery.

References

External links

 Henry F. Dobyns, "Tubac Through Four Centuries"
 Tubac Presidio State Historic Park and Museum
  "Through Our Parents' Eyes: History & Culture of Southern Arizona"
 Tubac – ghosttowns.com

Ghost towns in Arizona
Cemeteries in Arizona
Census-designated places in Santa Cruz County, Arizona
Populated places in the Sonoran Desert
Populated places established in 1752
1752 establishments in New Spain
Census-designated places in Arizona